Rachicerus honestus is a species of fly in the family Xylophagidae.

Distribution
United States.

References

Further reading

 

Xylophagidae
Insects described in 1877
Taxa named by Carl Robert Osten-Sacken
Diptera of North America